Fortress Festival was an annual music festival held in the Cultural District of Fort Worth, Texas. The event was held the last weekend in April on the grounds of the Will Rogers Memorial Center, and was produced by Fort Worth-based company Fortress Presents in partnership with the Modern Art Museum of Fort Worth, which also served as one of the event's venues in its first two years.

During its run, Fortress Festival sought to curate an eclectic mix of national, regional and local musical acts that reflect Fort Worth's diverse community and true artistic character. This is represented in lineups that contain a variety of genres, including Indie Rock, Pop, Rap, Hip hop, R&B, Soul, Punk and others. Additionally, Fortress Festival was recognized by the press as part of a small number of festivals worldwide for lineups that include a notable number of female artists across the bill.

On April 10, 2020, festival organizers announced that the event would not be held that year due to the coronavirus pandemic - while announcing that the festival was expected to be continued on April 24-25, 2021 with the majority of the artists in the 2020 lineup. On January 20, 2021, organizers announced the cancellation of that year's event, with hopes to return in 2022, but that plans for a revival never materialized.

Lineups

2017
Headlining acts: Run the Jewels, Purity Ring

Others:

 Flying Lotus
 Slowdive
 Nathaniel Rateliff & the Night Sweats
 Peter Hook and The Light
 Houndmouth
 Wolf Parade
 S U R V I V E
 Alvvays
 Whitney
 Dengue Fever
 Quaker City Night Hawks
 Sam Lao
 Sudie
 Ronnie Heart
 Burning Hotels
 Golden Dawn Arkestra
 Bobby Sessions
 Blue, The Misfit.
 Cure for Paranoia

2018
Headlining acts: Father John Misty, Chromeo

Others:

 Courtney Barnett
 De La Soul
 RZA (featuring Stone Mecca)
 Chicano Batman
 Tune-Yards
 The Voidz
 Rapsody
 Hurray for the Riff Raff
 Waxahatchee
 Shabazz Palaces
 Lee Fields and The Expressions
 Jay Som
 The Texas Gentlemen
 Bedouine
 Vandoliers
 Ronnie Heart
 Cure for Paranoia
 Andy Pickett
 Midnight Opera
 Henry the Archer
 Pearl Earl
 Francine Thirteen
 Juma Spears
 Sammy Kidd (of Mean Motor Scooter)

2019
Headlining acts:  Leon Bridges, CHVRCHΞS

Others:

 Rae Sremmurd
 Khruangbin
 Tinashe 
 Tank and the Bangas
 Superorganism
 Bobby Sessions
 Abhi The Nomad
 Red Shahan
 The Bright Light Social Hour
 Gio Chamba
 Blackillac
 Sailor Poon
 The Cush
 Solar Slim
 Adrian Stresow
 War Party
 Cardiac The Ghost
 Luna Luna

References

External links 
 Fortress Festival Website
 Fortress Festival Twitter Account
 Fortress Festival Instagram Account

Rock festivals in the United States
Pop music festivals in the United States
Music festivals in Texas
Music festivals established in 2017
Indie rock festivals